William Frederick McCaw (1850–1923) was an Irish born Canadian-American architect who worked in Toronto early in his career, then in the Pacific Northwest of the U.S., and then other areas in the U.S. He worked in a long succession of partnerships with various architects.

McCaw was born in Dublin, Ireland and moved to Canada in 1872 settling in Toronto, but moved to Portland, Oregon in 1882.

Several of his works, alone or with shared attribution, are listed on the U.S. National Register of Historic Places (NRHP).

Selected works 

First Presbyterian Church of Portland, 1200 SW Alder, Portland, OR (McCaw,William F.), NRHP-listed
The Dekum, 519 SW 3rd St., Portland, OR (McCaw, Martin & White), NRHP-listed
First Regiment Armory Annex, 123 NW Eleventh Ave., Portland, OR (McCaw & Martin), NRHP-listed
West Hall, 5000 N. Willamette Blvd., Portland, OR (McCaw, Martin & White), NRHP-listed

He lived in various cities for his work including San Francisco, Houston, Texas and Muskogee, Oklahoma. He died in Fresno, California in 1923.

References

Canadian architects
Architects from Portland, Oregon
Architects from Oklahoma
Architects from California
Architects from Texas
People from County Dublin
1850 births
1923 deaths
Canadian emigrants to the United States
Irish emigrants to Canada